Sandy's Gone is an album recorded by American jazz saxophonist Johnny Hodges featuring performances recorded in 1963 and released on the Verve label.

Reception

The Allmusic site awarded the album 3 stars

Track listing
Áll compositions by Claus Ogerman except as indicated
 "Sandy's Gone" - 2:10
 "Monkey Shack" - 2:16
 "Wonderful! Wonderful!" (Sherman Edwards, Ben Raleigh) - 2:14
 "Scarlett O'Hara" (Jerry Lordan) - 2:11
 "Candy's Theme" (Oliver Nelson) - 2:13
 "Follow Me" (Ogerman, Otto) - 1:53
 "Blue Velvet" (Bernie Wayne, Lee Morris) - 2:18
 "So Much in Love" (George Williams, Bill Jackson, Roy Straigis) - 2:22
 "Again" (Lionel Newman, Dorcas Cochran) - 1:56
 "Deep Purple (Peter DeRose, Mitchell Parish) - 2:20
 "Since" - 2:20
 ""The Caretakers" Theme" (Elmer Bernstein) - 2:03

Personnel
Johnny Hodges - alto saxophone
Joe Newman, Joe Wilder - trumpet
Hank Jones - piano
Wild Bill Davis - organ
Kenny Burrell - guitar
Milt Hinton - bass
Mel Lewis, Osie Johnson - drums
Orchestra arranged and conducted by Claus Ogerman

References

Johnny Hodges albums
1964 albums
Albums arranged by Claus Ogerman
Albums conducted by Claus Ogerman
Albums produced by Creed Taylor
Verve Records albums